Prime Minister Anders Fogh Rasmussen retained his parliamentary support in the 2005 Danish parliamentary election, and was able to continue as head of his government. On 18 February 2005, he presented his updated cabinet, the Cabinet of Anders Fogh Rasmussen II. One of the main issues of the cabinet was administrative reform that slashed the number of municipalities and replaced the thirteen counties with five regions.

Anders Fogh Rasmussen has referred to the reform as the biggest reform in thirty years. Furthermore, a reform of the police and judicial systems was initiated in January 2007, changing the numbers of police districts and city courts from 54 to 12 and 82 to 22 respectively. Rasmussen retained parliamentary support in the 2007 election and continued as Prime Minister in the Cabinet of Anders Fogh Rasmussen III, formed on 23 November 2007.

Notable events
On 8 June 2005 somebody made an arson attack on Minister for Refugees, Immigrants and Integration Rikke Hvilshøj's home. Rikke Hvilshøj, her husband, and her two small children escaped unharmed. It is not clear who was behind the attack (Though one unknown group has claimed responsibility), or what the motive were. Following the attack security was stepped up for several ministers. 
In January 2006 Prime Minister Anders Fogh Rasmussen became embroiled in the controversy of the Muhammad cartoons which initially were published in the Danish newspaper Jyllands-Posten.
On 13 December 2006 Lars Barfoed was forced to resign as Minister of Family and Consumption because of issues with the ministry's food inspections. Carina Christensen was named as Barfoed's replacement.
On 21 February 2007 Prime Minister Anders Fogh Rasmussen said that the 460 Danish troops in Iraq will have left by August.

Changes from the Cabinet of Anders Fogh Rasmussen I
Bertel Haarder changed from being Minister for Development Cooperation and Minister for Refugees, Immigrants and Integration to being Church Minister and Minister of Education.
The much-criticised Tove Fergo, who failed to get reelected to parliament (though that is not a requirement for a minister) was replaced as Church Minister.
Ulla Tørnæs switched from being Minister of Education to being Minister for Development Cooperation.
Rikke Hvilshøj was appointed Minister for Refugees, Immigrants and Integration.
Lars Barfoed replaced Henriette Kjær as Minister of Family and Consumption, after there had been some criticism Henriette Kjær because her personal finances were in disorder. Barfoed himself resigned, effective 14 December 2006.

List of ministers and portfolios
Some periods in the table below start before 18 February 2005 or end after 23 November 2007 because the minister was also in the Cabinet of Anders Fogh Rasmussen I or III.

References
 Regeringen Anders Fogh Rasmussen II – from the official website of the Folketing

2005 establishments in Denmark
2007 disestablishments in Denmark
Rasmussen, Anders Fogh 2
Anders Fogh Rasmussen
Cabinets established in 2005
Cabinets disestablished in 2007